Héctor Calegaris (27 June 1915 – 3 March 2008) was an Argentinian sailor. He won the Silver Medal in the Three Person Keelboat event in the 1960 Summer Olympics in Rome along with Jorge del Río Sálas and Jorge Salas Chávez

References

1915 births
2008 deaths
Olympic sailors of Argentina
Sailors at the 1960 Summer Olympics – Dragon
Argentine male sailors (sport)
Olympic silver medalists for Argentina
Olympic medalists in sailing
Medalists at the 1960 Summer Olympics